The term antiparallel may refer to:
 Antiparallel (biochemistry), the orientation of adjacent molecules
 Antiparallel (mathematics), the placement of parallel lines in relation to an angle
 Antiparallel (electronics), the polarity of devices run in parallel

See also
 Antiparallelogram